The Argyrogrammatini are a tribe of moths in the subfamily Plusiinae, consisting of fifteen genera.

References

Plusiinae